The 2022 African Women's Youth Handball Championship was held in Conakry, Guinea from 27 February to 4 March 2022. It also acted as the qualification tournament for the 2022 Women's Youth World Handball Championship to be held in Georgia.

Results
All times are local (UTC±0).

References

2022 in African handball
African Women's Youth Handball Championship
International handball competitions hosted by Guinea
African Youth
Youth
Sport in Conakry
African Women's Youth Handball Championship
African Women's Youth Handball Championship